John Edward Newman III (born August 2, 1999) is an American college basketball player for the Cincinnati Bearcats of the American Athletic Conference (AAC). He previously played for the Clemson Tigers.

Early life and high school career
Newman attended Greensboro Day School. He helped the team win three state titles, scoring 24 points and was named MVP of the NCISAA 3A State Championship game. As a senior, Newman averaged 14.7 points, 5.0 rebounds and 3.2 assists per game. He was named to the Associated Press North Carolina All-State Team and finished his high school career with 1,400 points, 500 rebounds, 200 assists, and 100 steals. In June 2017, he committed to Clemson. Newman also had offers from Boston College, Charlotte, Cincinnati, James Madison, Old Dominion, Providence and Wake Forest.

College career
Newman averaged 2.1 points and 1.8 rebounds per game as a freshman. In Clemson's first-ever win at North Carolina on January 11, 2020, he posted 17 points, six rebounds, four assists and two steals. On February 15, Newman scored a career-high 23 points in a 77–62 win against Louisville. As a sophomore, Newman averaged 9.5 points and 3.9 rebounds per game. He received less playing time as a junior, averaging 3.7 points and two rebounds per game. This was partially due to his suffering from knee problems.

After his junior season, Newman announced he intended to transferred to UNC Greensboro. On April 20, 2021 Newman announced he was decomitting from UNC Greensboro and would be transferring to Cincinnati, following Wes Miller who had recently been named as the new head coach for the Bearcats.

National team career
Newman was a part of the Clemson team chosen to represent the United States in the 2019 Summer Universiade in Italy. The U.S. received a gold medal after defeating Ukraine in the title game behind 20 points and seven rebounds from Newman. He averaged 13.3 points and 5.7 rebounds per game.

Career statistics

College

|-
| style="text-align:left;"| 2018–19
| style="text-align:left;"| Clemson
| 34 || 1 || 12.0 || .384 || .321 || .545 || 1.8 || .4 || .4 || .1 || 2.1
|-
| style="text-align:left;"| 2019–20
| style="text-align:left;"| Clemson
| 31 || 31 || 31.6 || .440 || .303 || .726 || 3.9 || 2.2 || 1.0 || .5 || 9.5
|-
| style="text-align:left;"| 2020–21
| style="text-align:left;"| Clemson
| 22 || 8 || 15.6 || .341 || .250 || .923 || 2.0 || 1.1 || .5 || .1 || 3.7
|-
| style="text-align:left;"| 2021–22
| style="text-align:left;"| Cincinnati
| 32 || 31 || 25.9 || .405 || .333 || .558 || 4.2 || 1.7 || 1.0 || .2 || 6.9
|- class="sortbottom"
| style="text-align:center;" colspan="2"| Career
| 119 || 71 || 21.5 || .406 || .308 || .675 || 3.0 || 1.4 || .7 || .3 || 5.6

Personal life
His father, John Newman II, played basketball at James Madison in the 1980s. A distant cousin, Johnny Newman, played at Richmond before embarking on a professional career.

References

External links
Cincinnati Bearcats bio
Clemson Tigers bio

1999 births
Living people
American men's basketball players
Cincinnati Bearcats men's basketball players
Clemson Tigers men's basketball players
Basketball players from Greensboro, North Carolina
Shooting guards
Small forwards
Universiade gold medalists for the United States
Universiade medalists in basketball
Medalists at the 2019 Summer Universiade